John Wilson Campbell (February 23, 1782 – September 24, 1833) was a United States representative from Ohio and a United States district judge of the United States District Court for the District of Ohio.

Education and career

Born on February 23, 1782, near Miller's Iron Works in Augusta County, Virginia, Campbell attended the common schools, taught school, then read law in 1808. He was admitted to the bar and entered private practice in West Union, Ohio from 1808 to 1826. He was prosecutor for Adams County, Ohio from 1809 to 1817. He was a Justice of the Peace for Tiffin Township, Adams County, Ohio from 1809 to 1815. He was a member of the Ohio House of Representatives in 1810, and from 1815 to 1817.

Congressional service

Campbell was elected as a Democratic-Republican from Ohio's 2nd congressional district and Ohio's 5th congressional district to the United States House of Representatives of the 15th through the 17th United States Congresses. reelected as a Jackson Democratic-Republican to the 18th United States Congress, and as a National Republican to the 19th United States Congress, serving from March 4, 1817, to March 3, 1827. He was Chairman of the Committee on Private Land Claims for the 16th through the 19th United States Congresses. He declined to be a candidate for renomination in 1826. Following his departure from Congress, Campbell resumed private practice in Brown County, Ohio from 1826 to 1829.

Federal judicial service

Campbell was nominated by President Andrew Jackson on March 6, 1829, to a seat on the United States District Court for the District of Ohio vacated by Judge William Creighton Jr. He was confirmed by the United States Senate on March 7, 1829, and received his commission the same day. His service terminated on September 24, 1833, due to his death in Delaware, Delaware County, Ohio. He was interred in the North Graveyard in Columbus, Ohio.

References

Sources

 
 

1782 births
1833 deaths
Ohio state court judges
Members of the Ohio House of Representatives
Judges of the United States District Court for the District of Ohio
United States federal judges appointed by Andrew Jackson
19th-century American judges
People from West Union, Ohio
Ohio National Republicans
County district attorneys in Ohio
Democratic-Republican Party members of the United States House of Representatives from Ohio
National Republican Party members of the United States House of Representatives
19th-century American politicians
Burials in Ohio